Of All the Things may refer to:

Of All the Things (album), a 2008 album by Jazzanova
Of All the Things (film), a 2012 Filipino film
Of All the Things (2008 film), a 2008 documentary
"Of All the Things", a song by Stephanie Mills from the 1974 album Movin' in the Right Direction